Talash (UAV) or "Hadaf (Target) UAV" is an Iranian unmanned aerial vehicle (UAV) which is considered to be the first drone of Quds Air Industries, and possesses a maximum speed of 140 km/h.

This Iranian made "unmanned aerial vehicle" which is based on the plans of Isfahan Academic Center for Education, Culture and Research (Isfahan University Jihad) researchers in 1985, consists of small dimensions. Talash UAV is piloted/controlled by the PCM radio control, and the drone can perform a variety of flight maneuvers among rolling/twisting and turning.

Talash uncrewed aerial vehicle, possesses 2 models, namely: Talash-1 and Talash-2, which have several differences. The speed of the first model (Talash-1) is 120 km/h, whereas Talash-2's speed is 140 km/h. The first model has its specific wheels for sitting and getting up. Talash-2 drone has more speed/maneuverability than the first model. This model of drone is utilized to get up from the JATO launcher (compressed gas launcher) and in order to recover from the parachute. The flight ceiling of "Talash-2 unmanned aerial vehicle" is two thousand and seven hundred meters, and the flight duration of the UAV is 45 about minutes.

See also 
 Armed Forces of the Islamic Republic of Iran
 Defense industry of Iran
 List of military equipment manufactured in Iran
 Islamic Republic of Iran Army Ground Forces

References 

 

Post–Cold War military equipment of Iran

Unmanned military aircraft of Iran
Iranian military aircraft
Aircraft manufactured in Iran
Islamic Republic of Iran Air Force
Unmanned aerial vehicles of Iran